Vedal, pronounced as Vaedaal is a village in the Cheyyur taluk of the Chengalpattu district of Tamil Nadu, India. Vedal is situated about  far from the Bay of Bengal coast.

It is well known for the temple of Shiva Vadavayil Andavar (meaning - Chola's Northern gateway GOD) located here, once upon a time it was the northern entrance for Chola Dynasty. It was the last among the temples built by the king Raja Raja Chola I.

Other names
The village is also known as Chozha Kerala Charurvedi mangalam or Neelasathurvedimangalam or Veera Chozha Sathurvedimangalam) Sathurvedi means - A Land where all 4 VEDAS are keenly practiced.

History 
It is believed  that after the death of Veerapandiya Kattabomman in 1799 CE, the Palaiyakkarar fled the region in the fear of the British army and settled in Kadapakkam, and after some time they shifted to Neelasathurvedimangalam, now known as Vedal. Vedal was once well known for paddy production in the region though it has declined with increase in conversion of agricultural land into plots.

Vedal Shivan Koil 

The Vedal Shivan Koil is believed to have been built during the era of Raja Raja Chola I.

Little care is being taken by the villagers or the Government to preserve this architecturally excellent temple. A huge crack is running through the middle of the vimana and the backside wall of the temple.
The Cholas reconstructed a lot of brick temples into granite temples. Only few brick temples are found today in Tamil Nadu state of South India. Especially, there is hardly any brick temple that exists near Chennai city today. Hence, Vadavamuga Agneeswarar temple located in Vedal is a rare one.

The temple which is almost in ruin has two separate shrines - the main shrine dedicated to Lord Shiva (Vadavamuga Agneeswarar) and the other one dedicated to Goddess Vasanta Nayaki. The main temple is built in the Gajabrashta architectural style (aka Thoonganai style which resembles the back side of the elephant).

The goshta images Ganesha, Dakshinamurthy, Vishnu, Brahma, Durga and Chandikeshwar are found on the wall surrounding the main shrine.

The vimana along with the images of the Gods is still impressive, though in ruins.

Climate 

Vedal  is heavily dependent on monsoon rain  and wells, and is therefore prone to droughts when the monsoons fail. The climate of the village ranges from dry sub-humid to semi-arid. The village has three distinct periods of rainfall:
Climate

The climate in Vedal region is basically semi-arid tropical. Four distinct seasons occur here, viz. 
South-West Monsoon (June-sep) advancing monsoon period with strong southwest winds
North-East Monsoon (Oct-Dec)with dominant northeast winds
Winter Season (Jan-Feb)
Summer Season (Mar-May)
Here, the dry season lasts from January to May. The Annual rainfall of Vedal is 627.1 mm with an average of 52.25 mm. The hottest months are April–June and the cold climate prevails during December and January.

Cultivation starts only when the Monsoon wind begins.

Demographics 

Male Population   1187

Female Population 1151

Total Population  2338

Religion

There are many temples in Vedal.

Economy 
The bulk of the population is engaged in agriculture and related activities. Rice and Groundnut very well suited to the semi-arid climate and Rice is the staple food item in vedal. Coconut, Sugarcane, chilies, are the other crops grown here. And  some horticultural products like bananas, mangoes, guava, papaya and jack fruit are also  grown. Much of the agricultural output is dependent on the south west monsoon  and hence gets challenging at times.

Vedal village has five rice mills, two flour mills, four tea shops  in which two rice mills have been recently upgraded to meet the growing demand.

Vedal Lake 

Vedal lake is the second largest lake in the Kanchipuram  District after the Madhuranthakam lake, with an span of 716 acres (3.9 km) and Vedal lake had been recently renovated under Tamil Nadu lake  Rehabilitation project at a cost of seventy five lakhs to enhance agriculture and ground water level.

About half of vedal's cultivatable land depends on this lake water, also ground water is keenly kept high because of this water.

Transport 

Vedal is connected by road to Chennai, Pondicherry, Melmaruvathur, Ginee and other major cities.

Vedal is easily accessible through East Coast Road. It is about 105 km from chennai and 50 km from Puducherry.

Auto rickshaws, cabs are available in Vedal. Private bus service connects Vedal with Cheyyur, Soonambedu, Tambaram and also travel to the nearby towns and Villages.

Railways 

Vedal is set to have a railway station in the future.

Vedal Cuisine 
Vedal cuisine is basically South Indian cuisine, where rice and rice-derived dishes form the major portion of a diet.  Traditionally food is served on a banana leaf instead of a plate (dishware) plate and eaten with the right hand. Rice is the staple food of Vedal People  and is typically eaten mixed with Sambhar (dish) or other  vegetarian or non-vegetarian kulambu, rasam, curdand buttermilk is accompanied with various vegetarian and/or non-vegetarian dishes like  kootu aviyal poriyal, and chicken, mutton, or fish fry.  Breakfast and snack items include dosai adai, idly, vadai, pongal, appam, paniyaram, uppumavu These items are eaten along with Sambar (dish) sambar, varieties of chatni.

Schools 
Government High School
K.V.S school

Villages in Chengalpattu district